Akchim is a rural locality (a village) in Krasnovishersky District, Perm Krai, Russia. The population was 3 as of 2010.

Geography 
Akchim is located 63 km east of Krasnovishersk (the district's administrative centre) by road. Mutikha is the nearest rural locality.

References 

Rural localities in Krasnovishersky District